A lance is a pole weapon based on the spear.

Lance may also refer to:

People
Lance (given name), including a list of people with the name
Lance (surname), including a list of people with the name

In the military
 , a United States Navy World War II minesweeper
 MGM-52 Lance, a former United States Army mobile field artillery tactical surface-to-surface missile system
 Lance corporal, a military rank
 Lances fournies, a military unit centred on an armoured knight and his retinue

Places
 Lance, Missouri, a community in the United States
 Łańce, a village in Poland

Transportation
 Piper PA-32R "Lance", a single-engine light airplane produced by Piper Aircraft
 Dennis Lance, a single-decker bus chassis manufactured by Dennis Specialist Vehicles
 Lance, a South Devon Railway Comet class steam locomotive

Other uses
 Lance Powersports, a scooter company
 Lance!, a Brazilian daily sports newspaper
 Lance Inc., a snack food company
 Lancet or lance, a type of medical scalpel with one or two sharp points that is typically used to make small puncture-type incision in the skin to drain puss or fluid
 AMD Lance Am7990 (Local Area Network Controller for Ethernet), an AMD Ethernet computer chip
 Lance, a game piece in shogi
 Lance or sand lance, various fish in the family Ammodytidae (sand eels)
 Oxygen lance, a pipe used in basic oxygen steelmaking

See also
 Lancer (disambiguation)
 Lancet (disambiguation)
 Lancing (disambiguation)
 Lantz (disambiguation)
 Lanz (disambiguation)
 Incision and drainage, known in the past as lancing, or to lance

ja:ランス